Newquay Pentire is an electoral division of Cornwall in the United Kingdom and returns one member to sit on Cornwall Council. The current Councillor is Joanna Kenny, a Liberal Democrat.

Extent
Newquay Pentire covers the south west of the town of Newquay, including the suburb of Pentire. The division covers 142 hectares in total.

Election results

2017 election

2013 election

2009 election

References

Newquay
Electoral divisions of Cornwall Council